Cinecittà World is an amusement park located in Rome, Italy. The park officially opened on 24 July 2014. The park currently consists of 3 roller coasters and is expected to attract increased tourism to the area.

Rides

References

External links 

Amusement parks in Italy
2014 establishments in Italy
Amusement parks opened in 2014